Stomach In, Chest Out is a 1988 Filipino comedy film co-written and directed by Junn P. Cabreira. The film stars Eddie Garcia, Joey Marquez, Lara Melissa de Leon, Mercy Dizon, Debraliz, Daphie Garcia, Beth Yalung, Dexter Doria, and Monica Herrera. Produced by Cine Suerte, the film was released on August 11, 1988. Critic Lav Diaz gave the film a mildly positive review for being different from the usual type of Filipino comedy films.

Plot
Four girls leave their pampered lives due to some missteps (both intentional and unintentional) and enlist themselves into the military, where they are trained by two leering officers.

Cast
Eddie Garcia as Kapitan Katakutan
Joey Marquez as Sarhento
Lara Melissa de Leon
Mercy Dizon
Debraliz
Daphie Garcia
Beth Yalung
Dexter Doria
Monica Herrera
Janice Jurado as Kapitan Katakutan's wife
Arsenio Bautista
Rudy Mayer
Rochelle Alfaro
Emil Cabanlig

Release
Stomach In, Chest Out was graded "B" by the Movie and Television Review and Classification Board (MTRCB), indicating a "Good" quality, and was released in theaters on August 11, 1988. It was a box office bomb.

Critical response
Lav Diaz, writing for the Manila Standard, gave the film a mildly positive review, deeming it an okay comedy which was saved by being different from other Filipino comedies that feature "dancing, singing, kidding around of loveteams, and zombies." He also described the relationship between Kapitan and Sarhento as similar to that of the animated characters Sylvester and Tweety. However, Meg Mendoza, also from the Manila Standard, stated that she considered both this film and Bobocop to be "two of the worst movies this year."

References

External links

1988 films
1988 comedy films
Filipino-language films
Philippine comedy films
Cine Suerte films